Michele Antonioli (born 31 January 1977 in Bormio) is an Italian short track speed skater who competed in the 1998 Winter Olympics and in the 2002 Winter Olympics.

In 1998 he was a member of the Italian relay team which finished fourth in the 5000 metre relay competition. In the 1000 metre event he finished 30th.

Four years later he won the silver medal in the 5000 metre relay contest.

External links
 profile
 Michele Antonioli at ISU
 

1977 births
Living people
Italian male short track speed skaters
Olympic short track speed skaters of Italy
Short track speed skaters at the 1998 Winter Olympics
Short track speed skaters at the 2002 Winter Olympics
Olympic silver medalists for Italy
Sportspeople from the Province of Sondrio
Olympic medalists in short track speed skating
Medalists at the 2002 Winter Olympics
Universiade medalists in short track speed skating
Universiade bronze medalists for Italy
Competitors at the 1997 Winter Universiade
20th-century Italian people